Lipton Cup may refer to:

Copa Lipton, an association football trophy contested between Argentina and Uruguay.
Sir Thomas Lipton Trophy, an association football competition that took place in Turin, Italy.
Lipton Challenge Cup, an association football competition competed between clubs from Southern Italy and Sicily.